Okwakee Creek is a stream in the U.S. states of Alabama and Mississippi.

Okwakee is a name derived from the Choctaw language purported to mean "ridge". Variant names are "Aulkwaukee Creek" and "Oakwalkey Creek".

References

Rivers of Alabama
Rivers of Washington County, Alabama
Rivers of Mississippi
Rivers of Greene County, Mississippi
Mississippi placenames of Native American origin
Alabama placenames of Native American origin